Zee Punjabi is an Indian free to air television channel and satellite television channel from Punjab, India. This channel is a part of Zee Entertainment Enterprises. It is of Punjabi language. It is the first-ever General Entertainment Channel (GEC) of Punjab has opened with record-breaking numbers.

History 
The channel is originally started in 1999 as Alpha TV Punjabi. After many years of closure, this TV channel has been re-launched on 13 January 2020 with new programs.

Reception 
In week 11 of 2020, it became No.1 channel in Punjab and Chandigarh within 3 months of its launch with 50386 impressions. After 2 years in week 14 of 2022, it became No.1 channel in Punjab and Chandigarh with 222.19 AMAs. In week 39 of 2022, it again became No.1 channel in Punjab and Chandigarh with 276.1 AMAs.

Current broadcasts

Drama series

Non-fiction shows

Upcoming broadcast

Former broadcasts

Drama series

Reality shows

Non-fiction shows

References

External links 
 Official Website

Punjabi-language television channels in India
2020 establishments in Punjab, India
Zee Entertainment Enterprises
Television channels and stations established in 2020